Feelings is the fifth studio album by David Byrne, released on June 17, 1997. The album is noted for Byrne's collaboration with the British band Morcheeba.

Cover art by Stefan Sagmeister.

Initial 50,000 copies of Feelings have featured die cut packaging.

Track listing
All songs written by David Byrne and produced by Morcheeba Productions and Byrne, except where noted.

Personnel

Musicians
Carlos Baptiste – violin
Black Cat Orchestra – Lori Goldston, Russ Meltzer, Don Crevie, Scott Granlund, Kyle Hanson, Matthew Sperry, Joseph Zajonc, Ed Pias
David Byrne – vocals, guitar, keyboards, synthesizer, loops
Ed Calle – saxophone
Lester Mendez - Keyboards & Programming on "Miss America"
Gerald Casale – bass and background vocals on "Wicked Little Doll"
Greg Cohen – bass guitar
Paula Cole – background vocals
Sterling Campbell - drums
Joe Galdo – drums, percussion
Juliet Haffner – viola
Nicholas Holland – cello
Ashley D. Horne – violin
Pierre La Roux – fiddle
Morcheeba: Skye Edwards, Paul Godfrey, and Ross Godfrey
Mark Mothersbaugh – synthesizer and samples on "Wicked Little Doll"
Hahn Rowe – keyboards
Mark Saunders – keyboards
Dana Teboe – trombone
Betty Wright – background vocals

Technicians
Michael Daube & Adele Lutz – Doll clothing
Kat Egan & Veronica Gonzales – Production coordination
Ted Jensen – Mastering
Stefan Sagmeister – Design
Tom Schierlitz – Photography
Yuji Yoshimoto – Model design and construction

Release history

References

External links
DavidByrne.com on Feelings

1997 albums
Albums produced by David Byrne
Albums with cover art by Stefan Sagmeister
David Byrne albums
Luaka Bop albums
Sire Records albums
Warner Records albums